The John W. Rea House is located in Hawthorne, Passaic County, New Jersey, United States. The house was built in 1810 and was added to the National Register of Historic Places on September 17, 1999.

See also
National Register of Historic Places listings in Passaic County, New Jersey

References

Hawthorne, New Jersey
Houses on the National Register of Historic Places in New Jersey
Houses completed in 1810
Houses in Passaic County, New Jersey
National Register of Historic Places in Passaic County, New Jersey
Stone houses in New Jersey
New Jersey Register of Historic Places